is a Latin phrase and slogan translated as "all things are to be held in common" or simply "all things in common". Originating in the Latin translation of the Acts of the Apostles, altered forms of the slogan were applied as a legal maxim in canon law and later in secular law. The phrase was also a central inspiration for Christian communism.

Origin
 derives from Acts 2:44 and 4:32 in the Christian Bible. The standard Koine Greek texts of the New Testament describe the Early Christians of the Apostolic Age as "having all things in common" (eîchon hápanta koiná). after the miracles of Pentecost while the apostles celebrated Shavuot in Jerusalem shortly after Jesus's crucifixion, resurrection, and ascension. This event is celebrated by Christians as the beginning of the church and usually dated to somewhere between AD30 and 36. After Peter's first trial before the Sanhedrin at some later date, the Christians are described as "one in heart and mind" and it is repeated that "to them all things were in common" (ēn autois panta koina). In the Vulgate, Jerome's Latin translation, these passages become "they held all things in common" and "to them all things were in common".

Legal doctrine 
In his treatise on justice in the Summa Theologica, 13th-century philosopher Thomas Aquinas used the same phrase, as well as the broader concept, to argue that it was not a sin for a person to steal if they were motivated by genuine need. Dialogus, a text written in the 14th century by William of Ockham, also used the specific Latin phrase . The same principle was later applied in secular law in various contexts, including justifying emergency taxation by a monarch.

Hugo Grotius used the phrase as adapted by Papiensis to argue that states must not prevent refugees from entering their lands if they had been forced out of their own. English jurist Matthew Hale added a qualifier, proposing that , literally "in cases of extreme necessity everything is held in common". In English common law, this essentially meant that private property could be seized by the government for the purpose of its defense, and the previous owners of that property would have no legal recourse. More broadly, it signified that the welfare of the community was prioritized over that of any individual. This concept developed over time into expropriation, as well as eminent domain.

Other historical use

The description of the members of the early church in Acts was a key inspiration for Christian communism.

In Utopia by Thomas More, the phrase  is used to describe the lifestyle of the Utopians, as on More's fictional island of Utopia "all things are held in common".

See also
 Koinonia – Christian fellowship
 Zwijndrechtse Nieuwlichters – 19th cent. Christian sect inspired by apostolic communism
 "From each according to his ability, to each according to his needs" – Communist slogan

References

Works cited 

 .

Latin words and phrases
Biblical phrases
Christian communism
Slogans